Bashir is a village in Iraq, located south of Kirkuk. It is populated by Shia Turkmens.

The village was captured by ISIL in June 2014. It was recaptured by Iraqi forces on 1 May 2016.

References

Populated places in Kirkuk Governorate
District capitals of Iraq
Turkmen communities in Iraq